Vladislav Vasilyevich Lisovets (born August 9, 1972) is a Russian stylist, hair stylist, designer and host.

Biography

Born and grew up in Baku (Azerbaijan SSR). Vlad's parents are hereditary rail-men. His father, Vasily Lisovets, is a train driver; mother, Tatiana Lisovets, is a chemist in the laboratory at the railway. He has an elder brother. Vladislav studied at the ballet and music school. He was educated as a barber, and than got a degree in Psychology.

In 1994 Lisovets moved from Baku to Moscow. He worked in Ostankino Technical Center, as a stylist of  Agatha Christie, Blestyashchiye, Anita Tsoy,  Jeanna Friske, Valery Leontiev, Avraam Russo.<ref>[http://www.vokrug.tv/person/show/Vlad_Lisovets/ Влад Лисовец на сайте ВокругТВ]</ref>

He owns several beauty salons.Говорят что...

Talk show host  Female Form  (from September 2008),  Week-style  and  Beauty Needs on Domashny  TV.  Member of the jury of the TV project Top Model po-russki.

 Filmography 
2009 — Moskva.ru as stylist
2010 — Daddy's Daughters as stylist
2012 — Your World (cameo)
2012 — Zaytsev +1  (cameo)
2014 — On March 8, the Man! as Anna's stylist
2014 — Di tutti i colori'' (cameo)

References

External links
 Official website 
 

1972 births
Living people
Businesspeople from Baku
Russian television presenters
Russian hairdressers
Russian designers
Russian radio personalities